Quidam is a Polish Progressive rock band, evolving from the hard rock/blues trio Deep River, a band formed by Maciek Meller, Radek Scholl and Rafał Jermakow. When Zbyszek Florek and Ewa Smarzyńska joined the band, the original Quidam line up was complete. In this line-up the debut album Quidam was recorded between September 1995 and March 1996. The album was produced with guest appearances of three Collage members: Wojtek Szadkowski, Mirek Gil and Krzysiek Palczewski.

Personnel

Current members
 Zbyszek Florek – keyboards, backing vocals
 Bartek Kossowicz – vocals
 Maciek Meller – guitars, backing vocals
 Maciek Wróblewski – drums
 Jacek Zasada – flutes, percussion
 Mariusz Ziółkowski – bass guitar

Former members
 Ewa Smarzyńska – flutes
 Emila Derkowska – vocal, backing vocals
 Rafał Jermakow – drums, percussion
 Radek Scholl – bass guitar
 Waldemar Ciechanowski – vocals

Discography

Studio albums

Live albums

References

External links
 Official Web Site of Quidam
 Quidam at last.fm

Polish progressive rock groups
Polish progressive metal musical groups